Anton Bruehl (11 March 1900 – 10 August 1982), was an Australian-born American fashion photographer.

Anton Bruehl was born in Hawker, Australia, in 1900, the son of German immigrants. In 1919 he moved to the United States to work as an electrical engineer, and was already "a skilled amateur photographer".

He died on 10 August 1982 in San Francisco, California.

References

1900 births
1982 deaths
Australian emigrants to the United States
20th-century American photographers
Fashion photographers